The Alfred Thayer Mahan Award for Literary Achievement is awarded each year by the Navy League of the United States. The award is named for an American naval historian and theorist, Rear Admiral Alfred Thayer Mahan, United States Navy who, through his writing, provided stimulus and guidance to those who share in the defense of the nation. Presented since 1957, "this award for literary achievement is awarded to a U.S. Navy officer, U.S. Marine Corps officer, enlisted service member, or civilian who has made a notable literary contribution that has advanced the knowledge of the importance of sea power in the United States."

List of award winners
The following is a complete list of award winners.

See also

 List of history awards

References

External links
Navy League of the United States
Navy League of the United States Award Program

American literary awards
Military literary awards
Awards established in 1957
1957 establishments in the United States